The Aeronaut's Windlass is the first novel of The Cinder Spires series written by Jim Butcher. It is a steampunk fantasy series. The story involves steampunk technologies, magical wars and intelligent cats.

Setting 
Spire Albion is the central setting, and is governed by constitutional monarchy. Technology based around vat-grown crystals allows them to create airships, which can sail the skies while functioning in most respects like a Golden Age of Sail vessel. These same crystals can be used to generate electricity and to power energy-based weapons. The technology and culture seems to be similar to that of Europe in the 18th century. The surface of their world is a place of horrors, full of dangerous beasts which occasionally make their way into the spires.

Characters 
The book follows two main characters and a handful of minor ones. Gwendolyn Lancaster is the heiress to her family's vast fortune and political power; the Lancasters being one of the few families capable of growing the crystals needed to power airships and weapons. Bridget Tagwynn is also the heiress to her family, but the Tagwynn family—once renowned thanks to a brilliant Admiral ancestor—is now reduced to running a meat ; little better than common folk. Joining the two main characters are a host of others including Bridget's best friend Rowl, a talking cat and prince of his tribe; Benedict, Gwendolyn's cousin and a 'warriorborn'—a human with cat-like eyes, preternatural strength and reflexes, and enhanced senses; Ferus and Folly, insane master and apprentice Etherealist and Captain Grimm, a disgraced former Fleet captain with a strong sense of honor.

Plot 
Captain Grimm is an Albion privateer preying on Auroran airships when his vessel, the Predator is caught in an ambush and has its invaluable lift crystal damaged. Meanwhile, Bridget and Gwen (along with Rowl) are new recruits in training for the Spirearch's Guard under the supervision of Gwen's cousin, Benedict. Near the end of their training, spire Albion suffers an attack by the forces of spire Aurora, who infiltrate their spire disguised as Albion guards and attempt to sabotage their crystal production facilities. Both Captain Grimm and the Spireguard group fight groups of invaders, eventually crossing paths when Grimm helps break up a Mexican standoff the guards found themselves in.

The monarch of Spire Albion, Spirearch Addison Orson Magnus Jeremiah Albion recruits Bridget, Gwen and Benedict to investigate his suspicions of further infiltration by the Auroran forces. He introduces the group to Ferus and Folly; a master Etherealist and his apprentice, and contracts Captain Grimm to transport them with the promise of new lift crystals for his damaged ship. Beginning their investigation, they quickly discover disturbances in Habble Landing, a lower level of the spire where much of the spires' commerce takes place. Bridget, Rowl and Folly find themselves ambushed by a teeming mass of silkweaver hatchlings, silverfish-like insects with a venomous bite. Meanwhile, Gwen, Benedict and Ferus are attacked in a tavern by a massive silkweaver matriarch which displays remarkable intelligence for what is supposedly a simple beast.

After the attacks, Bridget and Folly are taken prisoner by the Auroran forces and meet Sycorax Cavendish, an Etherealist working with the enemy. After Rowl escapes and sends word to Captain Grimm, he sets off to challenge the leader of the local cat tribe for help fighting off the invaders. Grimm and his crew make contact with the Verminocitors - a guild which earns its way by tracking down and killing dangerous surface beasts who have made their way into the spire - and launch a rescue mission to save their captured comrades. They find more adult silkweavers guarding the pair, and all seems to be lost until Rowl arrives with a force of 200 cats to turn the tide.

Meanwhile, the Auroran forces have launched their plans, stealing a valuable book known as The Index from a library before setting it on fire, then marching through the predominantly wooden Habble Landing, setting firebombs before escaping on a pirate vessel named the Mistshark captained by Grimm's ex-wife. After rescuing the two girls, Grim and crew return to the dock just in time to see it destroyed by the guns of his ex's ship. The Predator, newly repaired though not quite at full power, loads up and sets off in pursuit. They catch the Mistshark before it can rendezvous with the Auroran fleet and disable it. Before they can affect the surrender, they are attacked by the Auroran flagship Itasca. Outgunned by the larger vessel, the Predator flees to spire Albion, where a handful of Albion fleet ships intercept and give battle to the Itasca.

Emerging victorious from the final battle, the team returns to Spire Albion. There, they prepare for the upcoming war with Aurora while knowing that a deeper enemy lurks behind the attacks.

Reception 
The book was reviewed positively by SFF World, with reviewer Rob B. saying: "I remarked on Twitter that the best storytellers can transfer the joy they had in telling the story to the reader, in that conversation that a book/story is between reader and storyteller. It was very clear that Jim had a great deal of fun writing this one because it was an incredibly fun and engaging story".

The Fantasy Book Review rated it 9.0/10 and wrote: "The first in the Cinder Spires series is a joyously colourful mix between non-standard steampunk and epic fantasy. Swords, magic, guns and soaring sky ships dominate a world cocooned away from an unforgiving environment. Whether you like steampunk or straight fantasy, it can't be denied good writing is good writing and Jim gives it to you in The Aeronaut's Windlass by the shipload".

References

2015 American novels
2015 fantasy novels
American steampunk novels
American fantasy novels
Novels about cats
Novels by Jim Butcher
Penguin Books books